Future X-Cops (Mei loi ging chaat 未來警察) is a 2010 science fiction action film directed by Wong Jing. The film is about terrorists Kalong (Louis Fan) and Feina (Tang Yifei) who travel back in time to attempt to assassinate Professor Ma (Ma Jingwu). The two are chased by the cyborg cop Zhou Zhihao (Andy Lau) who has also traveled back in time to stop them.

The film was delayed in post-production to work on the special effects. The film performed well in Hong Kong where it was the second highest-grossing film in its opening week.

Plot
In 2080, in an unnamed Asian metropolis, cyborg terrorists attempt to assassinate Professor Ma (Ma Jingwu) on the tenth anniversary of his energy-saving Solar Canopy but are defeated by the cyborg cop Zhou Zhihao (Andy Lau). Zhou's wife, Meili (Fan Bingbing) is then killed and terrorist leader Kalong (Louis Fan) and his wife Feina (Tang Yifei) manage to escape arrest. Kalong and Feina travel back in time to 2020 to try to assassinate the teenage Ma but are pursued by Zhou and his daughter Qiqi (Xu Jiao). Posing as a traffic cop, Zhou attracts the attention of policewoman Wang Xue'e (Barbie Shu), who falls in love with him.

Cast
 Andy Lau as Zhou Zhihao (Kidd Zhou)
 Xu Jiao as Zhou Qiqi (Kiki Zhou)
 Barbie Shu as Wang Xue'e (Miss Holly)
 Fan Bingbing as Meili and Millie (Guest star)
 Ma Jingwu as Professor Ma (Professor Masterson)
 Tang Yifei as Feina (Fiona)
 Louis Fan as Kalong (Kalon)
 Mike He as Ma Jinxiang (Sergeant Masterson)
 Zhang Li as Huo Li Shuyi
 Liu Yiwei as Druggie
 Ding Sheng as Tie
 Law Kar-ying as Scissors
 Blackie Chen as Misfortune, the young undercover 2020 cop
 Huang Licheng as a 2080 cop
 Chen Xiaofeng as Kabao
 Xiao Jian as Stone

Production
To create the special effects for the film, Andy Lau wore a green jumpsuit which allowed computer-generated armor to be seen on his body.
Future X-Cops was delayed due to a lengthy post-production process in Korea that was made to boost the films visual effects. There were rumors of financial woes of one of the film's investors which director Wong Jing denied.

Release
Future X-Cops was released in China on March 30 and in Taiwan on April 2, 2010. The film grossed a total of $27,037 in Taiwan. It was released in Hong Kong on April 15 where it premiered in second place in box office rankings for that week. The film grossed a total of $439,978 in Hong Kong.

Reception
Film Business Asia gave the film a four out of ten rating noting poor effects, uneven acting, and "pothole-sized gaps in logic and continuity, even by Hong Kong genre standards."
Twitch Film gave the film a poor review stating that there was "honestly nothing to recommend in this film" and that it was "troubling to see how well it has been performing at the mainland box office. Its opening weekend here in Hong Kong is also seeing it beat out other new releases like Monga and Kick-Ass, both of which are far superior films."

References

External links
 

2010 films
2010 action thriller films
2010 science fiction action films
2010s spy films
2010s superhero films
Films about terrorism in Asia
Films directed by Wong Jing
Films set in 2020
Films set in 2080
Films set in Asia
Hong Kong science fiction action films
Chinese science fiction action films
Martial arts science fiction films
Films about time travel
Taiwanese science fiction action films
2010s Hong Kong films
2010s Cantonese-language films